Sphingonaepiopsis obscurus is a moth of the family Sphingidae. It is known from Madagascar.

References

Sphingonaepiopsis
Moths described in 1880
Moths of Madagascar
Moths of Africa